Forest Hays Jr. (June 8, 1928 – September 30, 1987) was an American politician in the state of Georgia.

Early life and education
Hays was born in High Point, Georgia, in 1928, and attended the now-demolished Chattanooga Valley High School. From 1946 to 1948, he was a seaman in the United States Navy.

In 1954, Hays began operating a business in nearby Chattanooga, Tennessee. It specialized in radio and television sales and service.

Political career
Hays was elected to the Georgia House of Representatives as a member of the Democratic Party in 1970. He represented parts of Northwest Georgia continuously from 1971 until his unexpected death in 1987. At the end of his tenure in the House, Hays sat on three committees: Defense & Veterans Affairs; Game, Fish & Recreation; and State Institutions & Properties, for he served as the committee's vice chairman.

During his time as a state representative, Hays resided in Flintstone, Georgia, and was a practicing Baptist.

Death
Hays died on September 30, 1987. He is buried with his wife at Lookout Cemetery in High Point, Georgia.

References

1928 births
1987 deaths
Democratic Party members of the Georgia House of Representatives